The 2014 FIFA World Cup Brazil qualification UEFA Group A was a UEFA qualifying group for the 2014 FIFA World Cup. The group comprised Belgium, Croatia, Macedonia, Scotland, Serbia and Wales.

The group winners, Belgium, qualified directly for the 2014 FIFA World Cup. Croatia placed among the eight best runners-up and advanced to the play-offs, where they were drawn to play home-and-away matches against Iceland. They drew the first match and won the second, thus also qualifying for the World Cup.

Standings

Matches
The match schedule was determined at a meeting in Brussels, Belgium, on 23 November 2011.

Goalscorers
There were 72 goals scored over 30 games, for an average of 2.40 goals per game.

4 goals

 Aleksandar Kolarov
 Gareth Bale
 Kevin De Bruyne

3 goals

 Filip Đuričić
 Aaron Ramsey
 Mario Mandžukić

2 goals

 Dušan Tadić
 Eden Hazard
 Vincent Kompany
 Romelu Lukaku
 Kevin Mirallas
 Christian Benteke
 Agim Ibraimi
 Robert Snodgrass
 Eduardo

1 goal

 Steven Defour
 Marouane Fellaini
 Guillaume Gillet
 Jan Vertonghen
 Vedran Ćorluka
 Nikica Jelavić
 Niko Kranjčar
 Dejan Lovren
 Ivica Olić
 Ivan Perišić
 Ivan Rakitić
 Adis Jahović
 Jovan Kostovski
 Nikolče Noveski
 Aleksandar Trajkovski
 Ivan Tričkovski
 Ikechi Anya
 Grant Hanley
 Shaun Maloney
 Kenny Miller
 James Morrison
 Steven Naismith
 Dušan Basta
 Filip Đorđević
 Branislav Ivanović
 Lazar Marković
 Aleksandar Mitrović
 Stefan Šćepović
 Miralem Sulejmani
 Zoran Tošić
 Hal Robson-Kanu
 Simon Church

1 own goal

 Stefan Ristovski (playing against Serbia)

Discipline

References

External links
Results and schedule for UEFA Group A (FIFA.com version)
Results and schedule for UEFA Group A (UEFA.com version)

A
2012–13 in Belgian football
Qual
2012–13 in Republic of Macedonia football
2013–14 in Republic of Macedonia football
2012–13 in Scottish football
2013–14 in Scottish football
2012–13 in Welsh football
2013–14 in Welsh football
2012–13 in Serbian football
2013–14 in Serbian football
2012–13 in Croatian football
Qual